Filipowicz is a Polish surname derived from the given name Filip.

The surname may refer to:

 Andrzej Filipowicz (born 1938), Polish chess player and arbiter
 Kornel Filipowicz (1913–1990), Polish author
 Maciej Filipowicz (born 1998), Polish footballer
 Paul Filipowicz (born 1950),  American blues musician
 Steve Filipowicz (1921–1975), American professional football and baseball player
 Tytus Filipowicz (1873–1953), Polish politician and diplomat
 Wanda Krahelska-Filipowicz (1886–1968), leading figure in Warsaw's underground resistance movement

See also 
 Filipović, South Slavic
 Pilipovich, Belarusian
 Filipavičius and Filipovičius, Lithuanian
 Filipovich, Russian

Polish-language surnames
Patronymic surnames
Surnames from given names